Eremias pleskei, commonly known as Pleske's racerunner or the trans-Caucasian racerunner, is a species of lizard in the family Lacertidae. The species is native to the Armenian Plateau in Armenia, Azerbaijan, Iran, and Turkey.

Etymology
The specific name, pleskei, is in honor of Russian zoologist Fedor Dmitrievich Pleske (1858–1932).

Habitat

Reproduction
E. pleskei is oviparous.

References

Further reading
Nikolsky AM (1905). "Herpetologia rossica". Mémoires de l'Académie des Sciences de St.-Pétersbourg 17 (1): 1–518. (Eremias pleskei, new species, p. 481).

Eremias
Reptiles described in 1905
Taxa named by Alexander Nikolsky